The Prince of Turov was the kniaz, the ruler or sub-ruler, of the Rus' Principality of Turov, a lordship based on the city of Turov, now Turaŭ in Homiel Voblast, Belarus.

Although not mentioned in his Testament of 1054, the city of Turov was ruled by the descendants of Iziaslav Iaroslavich, Grand Prince of Kiev. It fell into the control of  Vladimir Monomakh and the latter's son Mstislav Vladimirovich, who delegated control,  until the Iaroslavichi regained control in 1157 in the person of Iurii Iaroslavich in 1157.

List of princes of Turov
 Sviatopolk Vladimirovich, 980–1010
 under Grand Prince of Rus'''
Iziaslavichi
 Iziaslav Iaroslavich, 1045–1054
 under Grand Prince of Rus Iaropolk Piotr Iziaslavich, 1078–87
 to be filled
 Sviatopolk Iziaslavich, 1088–1093
 Viacheslav Iaropolkovich, 1094–1104/05
Monomakhs
 control of Grand Prince, 1105–1125
 Viacheslav Vladimirovich, 1125–1132
 Mikhail Viacheslavich, 1129
 Vsevolod Mstislavich, 1132
 Iziaslav Vladimirovich, 1132–1134
 Viacheslav Vladimirovich (again), 1134–1142
 to be filled Viacheslav Vladimirovich (3rd time), 1142–1146
 Andrei Boguliubski, 1150–1151
 Boris Yurevich, 1155–1157
Iziaslavovichi (again)
 Iurii Iaroslavich, 1157–1166 x 1167
 Iurii Iaroslavich, 1157–1167
 Sviatopolk Iurievich, d. 1190
 Ivan Iurievich, 1167–1190
 Gleb Iurievich, 1190–1195
 Ivan Iurievich (again), 1195–1207
 Rostislav Glebovich, 1207–1228
 Mstislav Fedor Glebovich, 1228–1235/8
 to be filled or unknown''
 Iurii Vladimirovich, d. 1292
 Dmitry Iurevich, 1292–?
 ?
 Daniil Dmitr'evich, ?–1366

Notes

External links
 

Turov
Turov